The 1959 Lady Wigram Trophy was a motor race held at the Wigram Airfield Circuit on 24 January 1959. It was the eighth Lady Wigram Trophy to be held and was won by Ron Flockhart in the BRM P25.

Classification

References

Lady Wigram Trophy
Lady
January 1959 sports events in New Zealand